The Emily M. Gray Award from the Biophysical Society in Rockville, Maryland, is given in recognition of "significant contributions to education in biophysics." The award was established in 1997 and first awarded the year thereafter.

Award recipients 

 1998: Muriel S. Prouty
 1999: Kensal E. van Holde
 2000: Charles Cantor and Paul Schimmel
 2001: Jane Richardson
 2002: Norma Allewell
 2003: Michael Summers
 2004: Richard D. Ludescher
 2005: Barry R. Lentz
 2006: Ignacio Tinoco, Jr.
 2007: John Steve Olson
 2008: David S. Eisenberg and Donald M. Crothers
 2009: Philip C. Nelson
 2010: Greta Pifat-Mrzljak
 2011: Bertil Hille
 2012: Kenneth Dill and Sarina Bromberg
 2013: Louis de Felice
 2014: Alberto Diaspro
 2015: Meyer Jackson
 2016: Douglas Robinson
 2017: Enrique De La Cruz
 2018: Madeline Shea
 2019: Yves De Koninck
 2021: Doug Barrick

References

External links 
 Emily M. Gray Award page

Biophysics awards
Education awards
American science and technology awards